Ongar Rural District was a local government district in Essex, England from 1894 to 1955. It included the small town of Chipping Ongar and the parishes surrounding it.

It was abolished in 1955 and combined with part of Epping Rural District to create Epping and Ongar Rural District.

References

Districts of England created by the Local Government Act 1894
Political history of Essex
Epping Forest District
Borough of Brentwood
Rural districts of England